This is a list of Viking metal bands. Viking metal is a style of heavy metal music with origins in black metal and Nordic folk music, characterized by a lyrical and thematic focus on Norse mythology, Norse paganism, and the Viking Age. Viking metal is quite diverse as a musical style, to the point where some  consider it more a cross-genre term than genre, but it is typically manifested as black metal with influences from Nordic folk music. Common traits include a slow-paced and heavy riffing style, anthemic choruses, use of both clean and harsh vocals, a reliance on folk instrumentation, and often the use of keyboards for atmospheric effect.

Viking metal emerged during the late-1980s through the mid-1990s as a rejection of Satanism and the occult, instead embracing the Vikings and paganism as the leaders of opposition to Christianity. It is similar, in lyrics, sound, and thematic imagery, to pagan metal, but pagan metal has a broader mythological focus and uses folk instrumentation more extensively. Most Viking metal bands originate from the Nordic countries, and nearly all bands claim that their members descend, directly or indirectly, from Vikings.

Though artists such as Led Zeppelin, Yngwie Malmsteen, Heavy Load, and Manowar have previously dealt with Viking themes, Bathory from Sweden is generally credited with pioneering the style with its albums Blood Fire Death (1988) and Hammerheart (1990), which launched a renewed interest in the Viking Age among heavy metal musicians. Enslaved, from Norway, followed up on this burgeoning Viking trend with Hordanes Land (1993) and Vikingligr Veldi (1994). Burzum, Emperor, Einherjer, and Helheim, among others, helped further develop the genre in the early through mid-1990s. Through the work of artists such as the German project Falkenbach, Viking metal soon spread from the Nordic countries to other nations with Viking history or an even broader Germanic heritage, and has since influenced musicians across the globe. The death metal bands Unleashed and Amon Amarth, which emerged in the early 1990s, also adopted Viking themes, broadening the style from its primarily black metal origin.

See also
Viking metal
List of folk metal bands
List of heavy metal bands
Heavy metal subgenres

References

Notes

Viking metal
 
Viking metal